Sweet and Low-Down is a 1944 film directed by Archie Mayo and starring Benny Goodman and Linda Darnell. The film was a fictionalized version of life with Goodman, his band, and their manager while entertaining at military camps. The song "I'm Making Believe" (lyrics by Mack Gordon; music by James V. Monaco) was nominated for an Academy Award.

Premise
A young trombonist lets his newfound success go to his head when he is invited to join the Benny Goodman Orchestra.

Cast
 Benny Goodman as Himself
 Linda Darnell as Trudy Wilson
 Jack Oakie as Popsy
 Lynn Bari as Pat Stirling
 James Cardwell as Johnny Birch
 Allyn Joslyn as Lester Barnes
 John Campbell as Dixie Zang
 Roy Benson as Skeets McCormick
 Dickie Moore as Military Cadet General 'Mogie' Carmichael

Notes
Lynn Bari seems to have been typecast by Fox as a big band singer, playing the role in Sun Valley Serenade (1941) and Archie Mayo's Orchestra Wives (1942). Her voice had been dubbed in those films by Pat Friday, and in this film, she was dubbed by Lorraine Elliot.

References

External links
 
 
 
 

1944 films
Films directed by Archie Mayo
American black-and-white films
1940s English-language films
1944 musical films
American musical films
20th Century Fox films
1940s American films